Redjas رجاص is a town in Mila Province, Algeria. At 16 km at west from Mila city, Redjas is the commune and district seat of Oued Endja.The city area is about 1.5 km², and between 340 M to 396 M at sea level. According to the 2008 census it has a population of 13883.

References 

Populated places in Mila Province